Avery A. Williams Sr (born September 2, 1994) is an American professional football middle linebacker for the Montreal Alouettes of the Canadian Football League (CFL). He was signed by the Houston Texans as an undrafted free agent after the 2017 NFL Draft. He played college football at Temple University.

Early years
Born Avery A. Williams in Baltimore, MD.. parents are Willinette and Anthony Williams. 
Played running back and defensive back… 2011 Private School All-State honoree … 2011 Baltimore Sun second-team All-State … 2011 All-MIAA B Conference pick … 2011 Baltimore Sun second-team All-Metro selection … as a senior, rushed for 1,325 yards and 12 TDs … had 76 tackles, 10 break-ups, and eight sacks an All-State, All-Metro, and All-Conference selection in wrestling … All-Conference and All-Metro honoree in track for Archbishop Curley High School in Baltimore, Maryland.

College career
After using a redshirt season in 2012, Williams played college football for the Temple Owls from 2013 to 2016. He became a full time starter at the strong side linebacker spot in his senior year in 2016 and appeared in 14 games. In his first game of the season. Williams had a career high 12 tackles, 1 tackle for loss and a sack. Concluding the 2016 season Williams had a total of 66 tackles, with nine tackles for losses, two sacks, two forced fumbles and two recoveries. Following his productive 2016 season, Williams was named - All-American Athletic Conference Second Team (AAC) ... ECAC First Team All-Star ... All-American Athletic Conference Third Team (Phil Steele) ... Eastern Football/Metro NY Football Writers Player of the Week (Cin) ... Defensive Production Player of the Week (Cin) and Selected to play in the NFLPA Collegiate Bowl (2017)

Professional career

Houston Texans
Williams was signed by the Houston Texans as an undrafted free agent on May 12, 2017. He was waived on September 2, 2017.

Ottawa Redblacks
On January 8, 2018, Williams signed with the Ottawa Redblacks. He made the team's active roster following training camp and played in his first professional game on June 21, 2018, against the Saskatchewan Roughriders. In the third game of the 2018 season, on July 6, 2018, against the Montreal Alouettes, he made his first career start. On August 17, 2018, he scored his first career touchdown as he returned a Matt Nichols fumble 43 yards for the score in a victory over the Winnipeg Blue Bombers. He played in 17 regular season games in his rookie year, starting in 11 of them, where he had 43 defensive tackles, six special teams tackles, one sack, two forced fumbles, and one touchdown. He also started in his first two post-season games that year, including the Eastern Conference final game and the 106th Grey Cup,

In 2019, Williams had a strong start to the season as he recorded 69 defensive tackles in the team's first 11 games before he suffered a season-ending injury. Williams was the team's nominee for the CFL's Most Outstanding Player and Most Outstanding Defensive Player awards. He did not play in 2020 due to the cancellation of the 2020 CFL season. Instead, he re-signed with the Redblacks on February 3, 2021.

In the pandemic-shortened 2021 season, Williams played in 13 regular season games where he had 89 defensive tackles, two sacks, one forced fumble, and his first career interception. He had his best career game in the opening game of the season where he recorded a franchise record-tying 14 defensive tackles and also one sack on August 7, 2021, in the win over the Edmonton Elks. At the end of the season, Williams was once again named the team's Most Outstanding Defensive Player and CFL East All-Star. 
In 18 games in the 2022 season. Williams had a career high 92 defensive tackles, 2 special teams tackles, 2 tackles for loss, 2 sacks, 2 forced fumbles, 1 interception, 3 pass deflections, and 1 fumble recovery. Williams was once again a star player for Ottawa in 2022, contributing with 92 defensive tackles, two special teams tackles, two sacks, two forced fumbles and one interception. Following the season, with his contract expiring and unable to agree to new terms, Ottawa released Williams on February 11, 2023 allowing him to pursue a contract elsewhere.

Montreal Alouettes 
On February 11, 2023, Williams and the Montreal Alouettes agreed to a contract.

References

External links
Ottawa Redblacks bio
Temple Owls bio

Living people
1994 births
American football linebackers
African-American players of American football
Temple Owls football players
Houston Texans players
Players of American football from Baltimore
Sportspeople from Baltimore
Ottawa Redblacks players
Canadian football linebackers
21st-century African-American sportspeople